Altani was a heroine of the Mongols and was the wife of Genghis Khan's mother Oelun's adopted son Borokhul.

Heroism 
Altani stayed in the camp of Hoelun, mother of Genghis Khan. A Tatar by the name of Qargil Shira entered the tent in which both of them stayed and pretended to come for hospitality. When Tolui, the youngest son of Genghis Khan and his first wife Börte, entered the tent, Qargil Shira grabbed the boy and ran out. Altani followed, prevented him from stabbing the boy and made him drop his knife. She held onto him so he could not escape with Tolui until Jetei and Jelme came and killed the Tatar. The guards and Altani all claimed credit for saving Tolui, but Genghis Khan made it clear she deserved chief merit. He laid praise on her as a baatar, or hero of the Mongols.

Notes

Sources
The Secret History of the Mongols

Women of the Mongol Empire
Genghis Khan
13th-century Mongolian women
12th-century Mongolian women
13th-century deaths
Year of birth unknown